Jordan Gutiérrez Nsang (born 8 July 1998) is a Spanish-born Equatoguinean professional footballer who plays as a forward for Tercera División RFEF club AE Prat and the Equatorial Guinea national team.

Professional career
Born in Barcelona, Catalonia, Gutiérrez is a youth product of RCD Espanyol, and in July 2017 signed his first contract with RCD Espanyol B until 2020. He made his senior debut with the reserves during the 2016–17 season, suffering relegation from Segunda División B.

On 16 September 2020, after two loan stints at Tercera División sides AD Alcorcón B and UA Horta, and a one-year spell at SCR Peña Deportiva in the third division, Gutiérrez joined CD Leganés and was assigned to the B-team in the fourth tier.

International career
Gutiérrez was born in Spain to a Spanish (Canarians) father and a Spanish-born mother, Sonia Nsang Silebó, who has Equatoguinean parents from the Fang and Bubi ethnics. Gutiérrez is a former youth international for Spain. He was called up to the senior Equatorial Guinea national football team in August 2017. Gutiérrez made his debut for Equatorial Guinea in a 2–1 friendly loss to Benin on 3 September 2017. The match was eliminated from FIFA records, as the referee and his assistants referees were from Equatorial Guinea. From 17 November 2018, Gutiérrez is cap-tied to Equatorial Guinea as he played for them in a competitive match against Senegal.

References

External links
Espanyol profile

1998 births
Living people
People of Bubi descent
Footballers from Barcelona
Citizens of Equatorial Guinea through descent
Spanish sportspeople of Equatoguinean descent
Spanish people of Bubi descent
Equatoguinean sportspeople of Spanish descent
Equatoguinean people of Catalan descent
Spanish footballers
Equatoguinean footballers
Association football forwards
RCD Espanyol B footballers
AD Alcorcón B players
UA Horta players
SCR Peña Deportiva players
CD Leganés B players
EC Granollers players
CD Manchego Ciudad Real players
AE Prat players
UE Santa Coloma players
Segunda División B players
Tercera División players
Tercera Federación players
Primera Divisió players
Spain youth international footballers
Equatorial Guinea international footballers
Equatoguinean expatriate footballers
Equatoguinean expatriate sportspeople in Andorra
Expatriate footballers in Andorra
Spanish expatriate footballers
Spanish expatriate sportspeople in Andorra